Josh Levi may refer to:
 Josh Levi (rugby union)
 Josh Levi (singer)